Georgina Cecilia Mary White (died 1944), better known by her pen name, Bride Broder, was a prominent Canadian journalist. She was the editor of The Mail and Empire's ladies' page and, after the merger which created The Globe and Mail, author of the paper's regular "Women's Point of View" column.

References

Year of birth missing
1944 deaths
20th-century Canadian journalists
Canadian women journalists
Journalists from Ontario
Canadian suffragists
Canadian temperance activists
Pseudonymous women writers
Canadian women non-fiction writers
20th-century Canadian women writers
20th-century pseudonymous writers
20th-century Canadian non-fiction writers